Two warships of Japan have been named Yūbari:

 , a cruiser launched in 1923 and sunk in 1944
 , a  launched in 1982 and stricken in 2010

Japanese Navy ship names